Lund University Libraries is a network of public research libraries in Lund, Sweden.

References

Literature

External links 
 Official site (English)
 Main branch, official site (English)

Academic libraries in Sweden